The town of Phrao or "Wiang Phrao" is home to the district headquarters of Phrao District in the far northeast of Chiang Mai province.

References

Cities and towns in Chiang Mai province